Ablaberoides is a genus of beetles within the family Melolonthidae.

Selected species 
 Ablaberoides crassus
 Ablaberoides fahraei
 Ablaberoides flavipennis
 Ablaberoides oscurifrons
 Ablaberoides pavoninus
 Ablaberoides tardus
 Ablaberoides testaceipennis

References

Melolonthinae 
Beetle genera